Anthony Blackwood (born 13 September 1982) is an English professional rugby league footballer who played for the Crusaders RL in the Super League, and the South Wales Scorpions in Championship 1.

Background
Blackwood was born in Barrow-In-Furness, Cumbria, England.

Playing career
Formerly a back-row player, Blackwood signed for Crusaders in 2007 from Halifax. He is a former Leigh Centurions academy captain.

International honours
Blackwood made his Wales début against Scotland in 2005, winning caps for Wales while at Halifax, and Celtic Crusaders 2005...present 7(6?)-caps 3-tries 12-points.

A regular and one of the most committed Welsh internationals, Anthony joined the Crusaders from Halifax at the start of last season following an impressive record with the Yorkshire-side. He continued to impress at the Crusaders in both the 2007 and 2008 season scoring 14 tries in year one followed by 11 in 2008

References

1982 births
Living people
Barrow Raiders players
British expatriates in France
Crusaders Rugby League players
English people of Welsh descent
English rugby league players
Expatriate rugby league players in France
Halifax R.L.F.C. players
Leigh Leopards players
Rugby league players from Barrow-in-Furness
Rugby league second-rows
Rugby league wingers
South Wales Scorpions players
Wales national rugby league team players